Weslley Pinto Batista (born 1 October 2003), known as Weslley Patati or just Patati, is a Brazilian footballer who plays as a forward for Santos.

Early life
Known as just Weslley at the time, he was born in Presidente Dutra, Maranhão, and began playing for local amateur sides. After not having money to buy himself a boot, he borrowed ones from other people to play; as they were much bigger than his foot, he was often called Patati, a Brazilian clown from duo Patati Patatá.

Club career

Early career
Patati played for local side Clube Atlético Maranhense before receiving an invitation to play for a club in Jataí, Goiás. After arriving in the city, he was abandoned and spent six months playing in a football school, struggling with hunger before returning to his hometown.

Santos
In December 2019, after a trial period, Patati signed a youth contract with Santos, being initially assigned to the under-17 team. On 11 January 2020, he signed his first professional contract, after agreeing to a three-year deal.

On 13 January 2022, already a regular with the under-20 squad, Patati renewed his contract until the end of 2024. He made his first team debut on 13 July, coming on as a second-half substitute for fellow youth graduate Ângelo in a 1–0 home win over Corinthians (4–1 aggregate loss), for the year's Copa do Brasil.

Patati made his Série A debut on 20 July 2022, replacing Léo Baptistão in a 2–0 home win over Botafogo.

Career statistics

References

2003 births
Living people
People from Maranhão
Brazilian footballers
Association football forwards
Campeonato Brasileiro Série A players
Santos FC players